The Kohl McCormick Academy of Outstanding Educators is an honorary organization whose members are recipients of the Kohl International Teaching Awards and the Kohl McCormick Early Childhood Teaching Awards. The Kohl International Teaching Awards were given each year from 1985 to 1994 by the Dolores Kohl Education Foundation. The Kohl McCormick Early Childhood Teaching Awards have been given each year from 1996 to present as a joint project of the Dolores Kohl Education Foundation and the McCormick Tribune Foundation. The academy works to promote excellence in education, individually and collectively, and to serve as an advisory body on educational issues.

See also
List of honorary societies

External links
Kohl McCormick Early Childhood Teaching Awards
Dolores Kohl Education Foundation
McCormick Tribune Foundation

Professional associations based in the United States